The 2005–06 Denver Nuggets season was the team's 40th in the NBA. They began the season hoping to improve upon their 49-33 output from the previous season. However, they came five games shy of tying it, finishing 44–38, but qualified for the playoffs for the third straight season. However, the Nuggets would be eliminated by the Los Angeles Clippers in the First Round in five games. In spite of regressing from last year's 49–33, the Nuggets won the division due to the presence of mediocrity.

For this season, they added new dark blue road alternate uniforms with light blue side panels to their jerseys and shorts, they remained in used until 2012.

Draft picks

Roster

Roster Notes
 Guard Julius Hodge also holds citizenship in the U.S. Virgin Islands.

Regular season

Season standings

Record vs. opponents

Game log

Playoffs

|- align="center" bgcolor="#ffcccc"
| 1
| April 22
| L.A. Clippers
| L 87–89
| Anthony, Miller (25)
| Marcus Camby (10)
| Andre Miller (6)
| Staples Center19,162
| 0–1
|- align="center" bgcolor="#ffcccc"
| 2
| April 24
| L.A. Clippers
| L 87–98
| Anthony, Camby (16)
| Marcus Camby (14)
| Andre Miller (6)
| Staples Center18,794
| 0–2
|- align="center" bgcolor="#ccffcc"
| 3
| April 27
| @ L.A. Clippers
| W 94–87
| Carmelo Anthony (24)
| Marcus Camby (14)
| Andre Miller (7)
| Pepsi Center19,099
| 1–2
|- align="center" bgcolor="#ffcccc"
| 4
| April 29
| @ L.A. Clippers
| L 86–100
| Carmelo Anthony (17)
| Carmelo Anthony (11)
| Andre Miller (9)
| Pepsi Center19,099
| 1–3
|- align="center" bgcolor="#ffcccc"
| 5
| May 1
| L.A. Clippers
| L 83–101
| Carmelo Anthony (23)
| Marcus Camby (11)
| Andre Miller (8)
| Staples Center18,648
| 1–4
|-

Player statistics

Regular season

Playoffs

Player Statistics Citation:

Awards and records
 Carmelo Anthony, All-NBA Third Team
 Marcus Camby, NBA All-Defensive Second Team

Transactions

References

Denver Nuggets seasons
Denver Nuggets
Denver Nuggets
Denver Nug